USS Gretchen has been the name of more than one United States Navy ship, and may refer to:

, a patrol boat in service from July to November 1917
, a patrol boat in commission from 1917 to 1919

Gretchen, USS